Grande Fratello VIP 5 (as known by the acronym GFVIP5)  is the fifth celebrity season of the Italian reality television franchise Grande Fratello.

This season was confirmed by Alfonso Signorini on 11 May 2020. It's the second season to air in 2020, and was launched on 14 September on Canale 5.

Alfonso Signorini, again, as presenter of the main show, with season 4 housemate Antonella Elia and the singer Pupo as opinionists.

The live stream is broadcast on Mediaset Extra and Grande Fratello official website, also La 5 broadcast several times per day. Daily recaps are broadcast on Canale 5 and Italia 1. This season also features two live shows per week.

The show was originally scheduled to last 82 days, with the finale on 4 December 2020. However, due to satisfactory ratings, the show was extended by over two months, making it 148 days long and with the finale on 8 February 2021. Due to this season being extended into February 2021, Grande Fratello 17, which was originally planned to air in Spring 2021, would be postponed indefinitely. On 27 November 2020, Mediaset decided to extend the season for another week, making the show 155 days with the finale on 15 February 2021. On December 27, 2020, Mediaset extended the show for the third time by eleven days, making the show 166 days and the finale on 26 February 2021. On 25 January 2021, Alfonso Signorini announced that for the fourth time (and to the discouragement of the original housemates), the show would be extended by three days, with the finale happening on 1 March 2021. In the end, the show lasted 169 days, making it the longest celebrity season at the time, being later surpassed by Grande Fratello VIP 6.

Tommaso Zorzi was announced as the winner of the season.

Housemates 
The age of the housemates refers to the time of entry into the house.

Guests

Future Appearances

In 2021, Dayane Mello competed in A Fazenda 13 (brazilian reality show), she finished the competition in 10th place.

In 2021, Giacomo Urtis once again competed on the show in Grande Fratello VIP 6, entering as a 2-in-1 contestant with Valeria Marini.

On January 7, 2022, Dayane made a cameo in Grande Fratello VIP 6, visiting contestant Soleil Sorge, one of her best friends.

Nominations table 
 2-in-1 housemate, their nominations counted as one. (Week 1 - 3)
 Housemate nominated by Grande Fratello for disciplinary measure.

Week 1 - Week 8

Week 9 - Week 18

Week 19 - Finale

Notes

: During the first live show, only female housemates could vote for which male housemate to face the consequence. Massimiliano received the most votes, he must stay in a washing machine for the night for a week.
: On Day 2 afternoon, Tommaso Zorzi temporarily left the house to the hospital and he back to the house on Day 3 morning. Flavia Vento decided to quit for personal reasons, and she left the house at midnight on Day 2 and Day 3.
: Andrea, Enock, Matilde, Patrizia and Tommaso were immuned since they are voted as the favorite of the week. New housemates were also can't be nominated. The public did not vote to evict a housemate but the one who received the least vote would be the first nominated on Day 8.
: The televoting which involved Fausto and Massimiliano was cancelled due to a disciplinary measure against a housemate. Fausto was ejected during the third live show for making offensive comments.
: The housemates that entered the house on Day 1 had to vote for one of the housemates that entered on Day 5 to be immune, the 2 most voted housemates were Denis and Elisabetta. The two then had to give immunity for a housemate entered on Day 5, they chose Francesco.
: Denis, Elisabetta and Francesco were immuned. Housemates are divided into groups by the day of their entry. Housemates who entered Day 5 would nominate in the confessional, while housemates who entered Day 1 would nominate in public. The public did not vote to evict a housemate but the one who received the least vote would be the first nominated on Day 12. Fulvio received the least vote, therefore being the first nominated for the next nomination, and face the public vote with Franceska, Massimiliano and Rosalinda.
: On Day 12, housemates could only nominate one housemate of their own gender. Female housemates would nominate in public while male housemates would nominate in the confessional.
: A surprise nomination was made for female housemates. Through a lottery mechanism, Franceska and Myriam obtained immunities. Subsequently, both of them were asked to name a housemate each of who must be evicted from the house immediately, but in fact, the housemates chosen will move to the "Cucurio" room. The two housemates they choose are Massimiliano and Tommaso. Massimiliano and Tommaso were asked to choose to remove the immunity of one of Franceska and Myriam, they chose Myriam and she will also have to move to the "Cucurio" room.
: Housemates could only nominate one housemate of their own gender (except Franceska). Female housemates would nominate in confessional while male housemates would nominate in the public. The public did not vote to evict a housemate but the one who received the least vote would be the first nominated on Day 19.
: The televoting which involved Dayane, Denis, Francesco, Guenda & Maria Teresa, Massimiliano, Rosalinda and Tommaso was cancelled due to a disciplinary measure against a housemate. Denis was ejected during the sixth live show for cursing in the night.
: A surprise nomination was made for male housemates. Through a lottery mechanism, Enock and Massimiliano obtained immunities. Subsequently, both of them were asked to name a female housemate to give immunity, they chose Matilde. Matilde was asked to choose to remove the immunity of one of Enock and Massimiliano, she chose Enock.
: The duo made up of Maria Teresa and Guenda were split and become two individual housemates.
: A surprise nomination was made for housemates. Franceska, the evicted housemate of the night, was asked to name a housemate who does not deserve to stay, she chose Myriam. Subsequently, Myriam was asked to choose who she does not want to obtain immunity, starting a chain of voting. Only the five housemates excluded from the chain will obtain immunity from the nomination.
: The public did not vote to evict a housemate but the one who received the least vote would be the first nominated on Day 26. Myriam received the least vote, therefore being the first nominated for the next nomination, and face the public vote with Maria Teresa and Stefania.
: Andrea, Enock, Elisabetta, Matilde, Patrizia and Pierpaolo were immuned since they are voted as the favorite of the week, and Myriam was already nominated for eviction. Immuned housemates nominated in confessional, and the housemates at risk for being nominated nominate in public.
: A surprise nomination was made for housemates. Maria Teresa and Stefania, the two housemates saved from the previous eviction, were asked to choose a housemate to save, they chose Tommaso. Then, Tommaso was asked to choose who he wants to save and starting a rescue chain. Guenda and Massimiliano were excluded from the rescue chain, must leave the house immediately and move to the "Cucurio" room, and subsequently, they were asked to choose two housemates to move with them, they chose Adua and Elisabetta.
: Andrea, Maria Teresa, Massimiliano, Pierpaolo and Tommaso were immuned since they are voted as the favorite of the week. The housemates in the "Cucurio" room would nominate in the confessional. While in the housemates in the Main House, through a lottery mechanism to chose they would nominate in the confessional or in public. The public did not vote to evict a housemate but the one who received the least vote would be the first nominated on Day 33. Matilde received the least vote, therefore being the first nominated for the next nomination, and face the public vote with Andrea, Guenda and Maria Teresa.
: A surprise nomination was made for housemates. The favorites of the house (except Matilde because she was already nominated for eviction), unlike the previous rounds, were not automatically immune. In fact, they would gambling by chance. Dayane, the lucky one receives immunity and was asked to choose to remove the immunity of one of the favorites of the house, she chose Pierpaolo.
: Dayane, Elisabetta and Enock were immuned since they are voted as the favorite of the week, and Matilde was already nominated for eviction. Immuned housemates nominated in confessional, and the housemates at risk, through a lottery mechanism to chose they would nominate in the confessional or in public.
: Guenda, Pierpaolo, Stefania and Tommaso were immuned since they are voted as the favorite of the week. Immuned housemates nominated in confessional, and the housemates at risk for being nominated nominate in public. The public did not vote to evict a housemate but the one who received the least vote would be the first nominated on Day 40. Elisabetta received the least vote, therefore being the first nominated for the next nomination, and face the public vote with Francesco, Guenda, Maria Teresa, Pierpaolo and Stefania.
: Patrizia, Rosalinda and Tommaso were immuned since they are voted as the favorite of the week, and Elisabetta was already nominated for eviction. Immuned housemates nominated in confessional, and the housemates at risk for being nominated nominate in public. This week's televoting will be open for a week and will be closed on Day 47.
: A surprise voting was made for housemates. Since televoting for eviction is still active, no new nominations were made. In fact, the housemates who are not nominated have the opportunity to influence the result of the televoting. They must name one of the nominated housemates they want to save.
: On Day 47 afternoon, Andrea Zelletta temporarily left the house for family reasons and he back to the house on Day 48 morning.
: A surprise nomination was made for housemates. The favorites of the house would be gambling by chance. Tommaso, the lucky one was asked to give immunity to one of the female housemates, he chose Stefania.
: Enock, Pierpaolo and Tommaso were immuned since they are voted as the favorite of the week, also Stefania is immuned by choice of Tommaso and Paolo as a new housemate. Immuned housemates nominated in confessional, and the housemates at risk for being nominated nominate in public. The public did not vote to evict a housemate but the two who received the least vote would be the first nominated on Day 50. Francesco and Massimiliano received the least vote, therefore being the first nominated for the next nomination, and face the public vote with Maria Teresa, Stefania and Paolo.
: Paolo was nominated by Grande Fratello for revealing some external details inside the house.
: Francesco, Massimiliano and Paolo were already nominated for eviction. The housemates already in nomination nominated in confessional and the housemates at risk for being nominated nominate in public. This week's televoting will be open for a week and will be closed on Day 57.
: The week-long televoting which involved Francesco, Maria Teresa, Massimiliano, Stefania and Paolo was cancelled after 4 days due to a disciplinary measure against a housemate.
: The previously cancelled televoting is reopened with the addition of Andrea among the nominated for revealing some external details inside the house.
: A surprise voting was made for housemates. Since televoting for eviction is still active, no new nominations were made. In fact, the housemates who are not nominated have the opportunity to influence the result of the televoting. They must name one of the nominated housemates they want to save.
: Stefano was ejected during the seventeenth live show for cursing in the night.
: Giulia was immuned as a new housemate. On Day 57, housemates could only nominate one housemate of their own gender. Female housemates would nominate in public while male housemates would nominate in the confessional. The public did not vote to evict a housemate but the one who received the least vote would be the first nominated on Day 61. Massimiliano received the least vote, therefore being the first nominated for the next nomination, and face the public vote with Andrea and Dayane.
: A surprise nomination was made for housemates. Massimiliano, the nominated housemate of the night, was asked to name a housemate who wants to save, she chose Rosalinda. Subsequently, Rosalinda was asked to choose who she does want to save, starting a rescue chain. The housemate excluded from the chain was Andrea, who goes directly to the nomination.
: Giulia and Selvaggia were immuned as new housemates while Andrea and Massimiliano were already nominated for eviction. The housemates at risk, through a lottery mechanism, chose they would nominate in the confessional or in public.
: Selvaggia was immuned as a new housemate while Giacomo was a guest in the house. Male housemates would nominate in public while female housemates would nominate in the confessional. The public did not vote to evict a housemate but the one who received the least vote would be the first nominated on Day 68. Patrizia received the least vote, therefore being the first nominated for the next nomination, and face the public vote with Dayane, Francesco and Rosalinda.
: A surprise voting was made for housemates. The favorites of the house were asked to choose to give the immunity of one of the "runner-up" favorites of the house (Andrea and Stefania), they chose Andrea.
: Elisabetta and Tommaso were immuned since they are voted as the favorite of the week, also Andrea is immuned by choice of Elisabetta and Tommaso, Selvaggia was immuned as a new housemate while Patrizia was already nominated and Giacomo was a guest inside the house. The housemates at risk, through a lottery mechanism, chose they would nominate in the confessional or in public.
: For this round of nomination, the housemates at risk, through a lottery mechanism to chose they would nominate in the confessional or in public.
: Cristiano was immuned as new housemates. For this round of nominations, the housemates at risk, through a lottery mechanism to chose they would nominate in the confessional or in public. The public did not vote to evict a housemate but the one who received the most vote would be exempt from nominations on Day 82. Dayane received the most vote, therefore being immuned for the next nomination.
: Following the two-month extension of the show, Grande Fratello offered housemates the opportunity to decide whether to immediately quit the game or to continue and stay in the house. Following the decisions made by the housemates, Francesco decides to leave the house immediately, while Elisabetta will remain in the house until Day 85.
: Dayane was immuned since she is voted as the favorite of the week, also Cristiano is immuned as new housemates. By officially becoming a housemate, Giacomo will be able to make the nominations. For this round of nominations, the housemates at risk would nominate in public. The public did not vote to evict a housemate but the one who received the most vote would be exempt from nominations, while the one who received the least vote would be the first nominated on Day 85. Rosalinda received the most vote, therefore being immuned for the next nomination, while Selvaggia received the least vote, therefore being the first nominated for the next nomination, and face the public vote with Andrea, Giacomo and Stefania.
: Rosalinda was immuned since she is voted as the favorite of the week, Cristiano is immuned as new housemates and while Selvaggia was already nominated. For this round of nominations, the housemates at risk would nominate in public.
: Filippo, Samantha and Sonia were immuned as new housemates. For this round of nominations, the housemates at risk would nominate in public. The public did not vote to evict a housemate but the one who received the least vote would be the first nominated on Day 92. Maria Teresa received the least vote, therefore being the first nominated for the next nomination, and face the public vote with Cristiano, Giacomo and Tommaso.
: A surprise nomination was made for housemates. The last six housemates entered the house, were asked to choose who among the "original" housemates do not want to obtain immunity, starting a chain of voting. The housemate excluded from the chain was Rosalinda, who will be exempt from nomination.
: Filippo, Samantha and Sonia were immuned as new housemates, Rosalinda is immuned by choice of the chain while Maria Teresa was already nominated. For this round of nominations, the housemates at risk, through a lottery mechanism to chose they would nominate in the confessional or in public.
: Filippo was ejected during the twenty-seventh live show following repeated sexist sentences addressed to some female housemates.
: Carlotta, Cecilia, Mario, Samantha, Sonia and Zenga were immuned as new housemates. For this round of nominations, the housemates at risk, through a lottery mechanism to chose they would nominate in the confessional or in public. The public did not vote to evict a housemate but the one who received the least vote would be the first nominated on Day 99. Giacomo received the least vote, therefore being the first nominated for the next nomination, and face the public vote with Maria Teresa, Samantha and Sonia.
: A surprise nomination was made for housemates. The last four housemates entered the house, were asked to choose who among the housemates, divied in couples, do not want to obtain immunity, starting a chain of voting. The housemate excluded from the chain were Dayane and Rosalinda, who subsequently faces the choice of Giacomo, the housemate already nominated. The housemate excluded from the chain was Dayane, who will be exempt from nomination.
: Carlotta, Cecilia, Mario and Zenga were immuned as new housemates, Dayane is immuned by choice of the chain while Giacomo was already nominated. For this round of nominations, the housemates at risk, through a lottery mechanism to chose they would nominate in the confessional or in public.
: The group of housemates that entered the game during the first week, either on Day 1 or on Day 5, were immuned, and only the housemates that entered the House subsequently were eligible to be nominated. Immuned housemates nominated in confessional, and the housemates at risk for being nominated nominate in public. This week's televoting will be open for a week, due to the following episode being a New Year's Day special, and will be closed on Day 113.
: For this round of nominations, the housemates, through a lottery mechanism to chose they would nominate in the confessional or in public.
: For this round of nominations, only female housemates are at risk, due to outnumbered male housemates in the house. Female housemates will nominate in public, while the male housemates could choose to do so either in the confessional or in public.
: For this round of nominations, the male housemates voted for the female housemate that they don't want in the final. The three female housemates who were not nominated were up for nomination to win a place in the final. Then another round to choose the fourth nominee was held among all the female housemates, who voted for the housemate they want in the final, with the possibility of self-voting.
: For this round of nominations, the female housemates (without Dayane) voted, in pairs, for the male housemate that they don't want in the final (the pairs were Carlotta-Samantha, Giulia-Rosalinda and Stefania-Maria Teresa). In case of disagreement between the members of the pair, the first elected finalist Dayane would choose which member would get to decide. She chose Giulia for the Giulia-Rosalinda pair. The remaining male housemate who was not nominated was up for nomination to win a place in the final. Then another round to choose the second nominee was held among all the male housemates plus Dayane, who voted for the housemate they want in the final, with the possibility of self-voting.
: For this round of nominations, the housemates voted publicly for who they wanted to nominate. The two contestants elected finalists, Dayane and Pierpaolo, voted in the confessional and had the advantage of knowing the number of votes each housemate had received before making their vote.
: Following a disciplinary measure, a flash televoting is opened which determines whether Alda will be able to stay in the House.
: Alfonso Signorini announced that the first round of the finals would officially start at the end of Day 166. The last remaining housemate not to be named a finalist through the public vote, Andrea, had to choose one of the four other contestants to face in a televoting that would be closed on Day 169.

Favorite of the House 
The public has the opportunity to vote for their favorite housemate, the result would affect the nominations. The housemates received the majority votes receive immunity. Only the housemates who received the minority votes would be available to be nominated.

TV Ratings and guests 
Live shows

References

External links 
 Official site 

05